Rockmont may refer to:

Rockmont, Wisconsin, an unincorporated community, United States
Camp Rockmont for Boys, North Carolina, United States